WXMF (91.9 FM) is a radio station  broadcasting a Christian radio format. Licensed to Marion, Ohio, United States, the station is currently owned by Kayser Broadcast Ministries.

WXMF airs a variety of Christian talk and teaching programs including; Revive our Hearts with Nancy Leigh DeMoss, Insight for Living with Chuck Swindoll, and In the Market with Janet Parshall.  WXMF also airs a variety of Christian music.

References

External links
WXMF's official website

Moody Radio affiliate stations
XMF